Marine Corps Combat Development Command (MCCDC), located at Marine Corps Base Quantico in Prince William County, Virginia, has the mission of supporting the development of future operational concepts and the determination of how to best organize, train, educate and equip the Marine Corps of the future. Since 2005, the commanding general for the Marine Corps Combat Development Command (MCCDC) has been dual hatted as the deputy commander, Combat Development & Integration (DC, CD&I).

History
The predecessor to the MCCDC, Marine Corps Schools Quantico, was established in 1921 by the 13th Commandant of the United States Marine Corps, Major General John A. Lejeune. Prospects of a Pacific war led to the development of the concepts and techniques of amphibious warfare, which were then applied in the Pacific theater of World War II. On 1 Jan. 1968, the Marine Corps Schools was re-designated the Marine Corps Development and Education Command (MCDEC). On 10 Nov. 1987, the Marine Corps Combat Development Command (MCCDC) was created. In 2005 the commanding general for Marine Corps Combat Development Command was dual hatted as the deputy commandant for combat development and integration (DC, DC&I).

Subordinate units
 Operational Analysis Directorate
 Training and Education Command
 Marine Corps Embassy Security Group
 Capabilities and Development Directorate
 Marine Corps Warfighting Laboratory

References

Military education and training in the United States
United States Marine Corps schools
Commands of the United States Marine Corps
Superfund sites in Virginia
Military Superfund sites